DXNS (102.3 FM), on-air as 102.3 Bee FM, is a radio station owned by Northern Mindanao Broadcasting System and operated by Quest Broadcasting Inc. It is the partner station of Tiger 22 Media. The station's studio and transmitter are located at the 4th Floor, L.T. & Sons Bldg., Montilla Blvd., Butuan.

History
The station was established on February 11, 2000, as Killer Bee under Quest Broadcasting. Thus, Killer Bee 102.3 FM was born. It went off the air on June 23, 2008.

A few months later, it returned on air, this time as Caraga's Hit Radio. In 2010, it brought back the Killer Bee branding. In 2014, a year after its sister stations started carrying the Magic branding, it renamed to Bee FM.

References

Radio stations in Butuan
Radio stations established in 2000